Hubert Deittert (21 March 1941 – 19 April 2020) was a German politician and member of CDU in the Bundestag from 1994 until 2009. He was born in Rietberg.

References

External links 
 Bundestag biography 

1941 births
2020 deaths
Members of the Bundestag for North Rhine-Westphalia
Members of the Bundestag 2005–2009
Members of the Bundestag 2002–2005
Members of the Bundestag 1998–2002
Members of the Bundestag 1994–1998
Members of the Bundestag for the Christian Democratic Union of Germany